Several battles have been fought at or near the town of Lacolle, Quebec, Canada:

 Battle of Lacolle Mills (1812), British victory during the War of 1812
 Battle of Lacolle Mills (1814), British victory during the War of 1812
 Battle of Lacolle (1838), British authorities rout rebels during the Lower Canada Rebellion